Mojo: Conjure Stories is an anthology of fantasy and horror short stories, edited by the writer Nalo Hopkinson and published in 2003.

Stories
 Andy Duncan, Daddy Mention and the Monday Skull
 Kiini Ibura Salaam, Rosamojo 
 Barth Anderson, Lark till Dawn, Princess
 Steven Barnes, Heartspace
 Gregory Frost, The Prowl
 Jenise Aminoff, Fate
 Tananarive Due, Trial Day
 Jarla Tangh, The Skinned
 Tobias S. Buckell, Death's Dreadlocks
 Nnedima Okorafor, Asuquo, or The Winds of Harmattan
 Barbara Hambly, The Horsemen and the Morning Star
 Gerard Houarner, She'd Make a Dead Man Crawl
 A. M. Dellamonica, Cooking Creole
 Eliot Fintushel, White Man’s Trick
 Nisi Shawl, The Tawny Bitch
 Neil Gaiman, Bitter Grounds
 Devorah Major, Shining through 24/7
 Marcia Douglas, Notes from a Writer’s Book of Cures and Spells
 Sheree Renee Thomas, How Sukie Cross de Big Wata

2003 anthologies
Fantasy short story collections
Horror short story collections
Works by Nalo Hopkinson